Kroonika (meaning The Chronicle in English) is a popular Estonian magazine which is typically popular with young Estonian persons aged between 13 and 30 years of age.

History and profile
Kroonika was established in 1996. Its previous publishers were Kroonpress Ltd. and AS Ajakirjade Kirjastus. The magazine is published by in the Estonian language and includes gossip and news on the country's biggest celebrities. It is published weekly on Fridays and is based in Tallinn. Its editor-in-chief is Krista Lensin.

Erika Salumäe, an Estonian track bicycle racer and Olympic champion, sued the magazine for publishing damaging and insulting news about her in 2016. In 2018 the publisher, Ekspress Meedia, was ordered by the court to pay Salumäe 9,500 Euros.

References

External links

1996 establishments in Estonia
Celebrity magazines
Estonian-language magazines
Magazines established in 1996
Magazines published in Estonia
Mass media in Tallinn
Weekly magazines